JLF may refer to:
 Jaipur Literature Festival
 John Locke Foundation